Abhirami Suresh (born 9 October 1995) is an Indian actress, singer, musician, composer, and video jockey. She began her acting career as a child (at age 12) with the television serial Hello Kuttichathan on Asianet, and her first composition was released at age 14. Meera in Beware of Dogs (2014) was her first character in a female lead role in a film. She is also known for anchoring the musical show Dear Kappa on Kappa TV. Abhirami and her sister Amritha Suresh are the lead vocalists of their music band Amrutam Gamaya. They are also known for vlogging, with the series AG Vlogs on their YouTube channel Amrutam Gamay – AG.

Early and personal life
She was born on 9 October 1995 to P. R. Suresh and Laila. She has an elder sister, singer-composer Amrutha Suresh. She used to perform mimicry and monoact in her schools and "never missed out on a chance to be on the stage". In an interview, Abhirami said she always wanted to be an actress and although she hails from a family of musicians she never saw herself as a singer or thought of pursuing music until Amrutam Gamay was formed. After completing class eleven, she did a diploma in acting. She has directed a short film as part of her undergraduate course. She runs a jewelry brand, Aamindo. Abhirami is also into modelling. She has walked the ramp in Kerala Fashion Runway 2018. She was also featured on the cover page of Vanitha Magazine along with her sister.She has featured in popular magazines like Kanyaka, Manorama Arogyam etc.

Career

Film and television
Abhirami got her first acting offer after her impressions of host Ranjini Haridas and judge Sharreth on the music reality television show Idea Star Singer (2007) on Asianet in which her sister Amrutha Suresh was participating. Due to the popularity of this, she got an offer to act in the children's television serial Hello Kuttichathan (2008 – 2009) on Asianet. She was 12 years old then and played the role of Nimmi. The show was well received by the audience. It was followed by roles in films such as Keralotsavam 2009 and Gulumaal: The Escape (both in 2009).

She made her Tamil acting debut with Kerala Nattilam Pengaludane (2014), a Malayalam-Tamil bilingual comedy in which she played a Malayali Muslim girl named Nisha who aspires to become Miss Kerala. She got the offer when she was in AVM Studios with Amrutha for recording a song, where director S. S. Kumaran met them who was looking for a newcomer for his film. Her first character as a female lead was in Beware of Dogs (2014). It was a comedy-drama and she played Meera in the film. It was followed by the romantic drama 100 Days of Love (2015) in which she played a supporting role as Pia George, the ex-girlfriend of Balan (Dulquer Salmaan). She played the female lead role in her second Tamil film, Kubera Rasi (2015), which revolves around a bank robbery.

In December 2018, Abhirami and Amrutha started a YouTube channel, Amrutam Gamay – AG, with the series AG Vlogs to publish their creative content. The content is related to their personal lives, travel, food, music, shopping among other things. In 2019, she acted in the teenage short film Viral.  In 2020, Abhirami and Amrutha was invited to take part in the second season of Malayalam reality television game show Bigg Boss as contestants, however, they refused the offer because of other commitments. Later, they entered the Bigg Boss (Malayalam season 2) house as wildcard entrants on day 50.

Music
Abhirami began composing at a young age, her debut composition came out when she was 14 years old. She is a  keyboardist and plays the violin. She has composed several bhajans in her early stint. The music band Amrutam Gamay was launched in 2014 in which her sister Amrutha and herself are the lead vocalists. The band performed internationally at gigs within six months of its formation. Abhirami was initially not part of the band which was founded by her sister Amrutha, but Amrutha invited her after hearing her rendition of a song they were preparing to perform on their debut on Kappa TV. Their cover version of Israeli folk song "Hava Nagila" sung by Amrutha was popular among the global Jewish community. In 2015, Abhirami and Amrutha wrote and composed multiple original songs for their band, including "Katturumbu", "Ayyayo", and "Harps of Peace". In the same year, Abhirami began hosting (as VJ) the daily music show Dear Kappa on Kappa TV.

Abhirami and Amrutha composed and sang a single for the film Crossroad (2017); it was the title song of the film and was composed in a short notice. It was followed by a single in the film Aadu 2 (2017), titled "Aadu 2 – Success Song". Abhirami independently composed the soundtrack of the film Sullu (2019).

Filmography

Television

Films

Discography

Online appearances

Awards
 Ramu Kairat Sangeetha Award (Special Jury) 2019 - Sullu

References

External links
 
 
 
 

Living people
21st-century Indian actresses
1995 births
People from Ernakulam district
Singers from Kochi
Indian women singers
Indian women songwriters
Malayalam playback singers
Actresses in Malayalam cinema
Actresses from Kerala
Indian women musicians
Indian women composers
Indian VJs (media personalities)
Indian women television presenters
Actresses in Malayalam television
Actresses in Tamil cinema
Bigg Boss Malayalam contestants